The Castle is a lava spine located west of Squamish in southwestern British Columbia, Canada. Volcanism at The Castle is controlled by north–south structures and there are no hot springs known in the area. It forms part of the Monmouth Creek complex and is part of the Garibaldi Volcanic Belt which is a segment of the Cascade Volcanic Arc.

See also
 Cascade Volcanoes
 Garibaldi Volcanic Belt
 Mount Garibaldi
 List of volcanoes in Canada
 Volcanism of Canada
 Volcanism of Western Canada

References

Mountains of British Columbia under 1000 metres
Garibaldi Volcanic Belt
Volcanoes of British Columbia
Subduction volcanoes
Pleistocene volcanoes
New Westminster Land District